SS Jerry S. Foley was a Liberty ship built in the United States during World War II. She was named after Jerry S. Foley a prominent businessman in Jacksonville, Florida. Foley was the president of the Brooks-Scanlon Lumber Company, in Foley, Florida; on the board of directors of the Atlantic National Bank, in Jacksonville; president of the Bahamas-Cuban Co.; and president of the LOP&G Railroad.

Construction
Jerry S. Foley was laid down on 23 August 1944, under a Maritime Commission (MARCOM) contract, MC hull 2497, by the St. Johns River Shipbuilding Company, Jacksonville, Florida; she was sponsored by Mrs. Jerry S. Foley, the wife of the namesake, and was launched on 29 September 1944.

History
She was allocated to the American South African Lines Inc., on 11 October 1944. On 9 October 1948, she was laid up in the National Defense Reserve Fleet, Beaumont, Texas. She was sold for scrapping, 5 October 1970, to Reman Shipping Co., for $42,500. She was removed from the fleet, 12 November 1970.

References

Bibliography

 
 
 
 

 

Liberty ships
Ships built in Jacksonville, Florida
1944 ships
Beaumont Reserve Fleet